Priviledge Mupeti (born 29 September 1997) is a Zimbabwean footballer who plays as a forward for the Zimbabwe women's national team.

International career
Mupeti capped for Zimbabwe at senior level during the 2021 COSAFA Women's Championship.

References

1997 births
Living people
Zimbabwean women's footballers
Women's association football forwards
Zimbabwe women's international footballers